Guillaume Boivin (born 25 May 1989) is a Canadian professional road racing cyclist, who currently rides for UCI WorldTeam .

Career
Boivin's greatest cycling accomplishment was finishing in a dead heat for the bronze at the World Under-23 Road Race Championships in 2010. He finished 3rd in the 2012 Tro Bro Leon, getting on the podium with his teammate Ryan Roth, who won the race. On 29 April 2015, on the first stage of the Tour of the Gila, Boivin was the last man remaining of a breakaway that was caught by eventual solo winner, Rafael Montiel. Boivin took the second place of the mountaintop finish.

In May 2018, he was named in the startlist for the Giro d'Italia.

2020 Olympics
In July 2021, Boivin was named to Canada's 2020 Olympic team.

Major results
Source: 

2006
 3rd Overall Tour de l'Abitibi
2007
 4th Overall Tour de l'Abitibi
1st Points classification
1st Stages 2 & 7
2008
 1st  Overall Tour de Québec
1st Stage 3
2009
 1st  Road race, National Under-23 Road Championships
 2nd  Time trial, Canada Summer Games
2010
 1st  Overall Tour de Québec
1st Stage 3
 1st Stage 13 Vuelta a Cuba
 2nd Sparkassen Giro Bochum
 3rd  Road race, UCI Under-23 Road World Championships
 6th Philadelphia International Championship
 7th Overall Mi-Août en Bretagne
1st Stages 1 & 3
2012
 2nd Ronde van Drenthe
 3rd Tro-Bro Léon
 4th Handzame Classic
 4th Grand Prix Pino Cerami
 5th Grand Prix de Denain
 7th Overall World Ports Classic
 10th Scheldeprijs
2013
 1st Stage 2 Tour de Beauce
2015
 1st  Road race, National Road Championships
 1st Stage 3b Tour de Beauce
 3rd  Road race, Pan American Games
 3rd Overall Grand Prix Cycliste de Saguenay
1st  Points classification
 5th Overall GP Internacional do Guadiana
 5th Clássica Loulé
2016
 1st Stage 1 Tour of Rwanda
 7th Trofej Umag
 7th Circuito del Porto
2017
 2nd Overall Tour of Taihu Lake
1st Prologue 
 2nd Overall Grand Prix Cycliste de Saguenay
 2nd Coppa Bernocchi
 4th Road race, National Road Championships
 8th Memorial Marco Pantani
2018
 1st Famenne Ardenne Classic
 4th Gooikse Pijl
 7th Kuurne–Brussels–Kuurne
2019
 2nd Overall Vuelta a Castilla y León
 8th Druivenkoers Overijse
2021
 1st  Road race, National Road Championships
 9th Paris–Roubaix
2022
 2nd Road race, National Road Championships
 5th Primus Classic
 8th Heistse Pijl
 9th Famenne Ardenne Classic

Grand Tour general classification results timeline

References

External links

Spidertech Team Bio

1989 births
Canadian male cyclists
French Quebecers
Living people
Cyclists from Montreal
Pan American Games medalists in cycling
Pan American Games bronze medalists for Canada
Cyclists at the 2011 Pan American Games
Cyclists at the 2015 Pan American Games
Medalists at the 2015 Pan American Games
Olympic cyclists of Canada
Cyclists at the 2020 Summer Olympics